Saheed Mustapha (born 13 July 1994) is a German-Nigerian footballer who plays as a centre-back for NOFV-Oberliga Nord club RSV Eintracht 1949.

Career
Mustapha made his professional debut for Rot-Weiß Erfurt in the 3. Liga on 13 April 2014, starting in the away match against Chemnitzer FC. He was sent off with a direct red card in the 70th minute after conceding a penalty for a foul inside the box (which was subsequently saved by Philipp Klewin). The match finished as a 0–4 loss.

References

External links
 Profile at DFB.de
 
 Rot-Weiß Erfurt II statistics at Fussball.de

1994 births
German sportspeople of Nigerian descent
Footballers from Berlin
Living people
German footballers
Association football central defenders
Chemnitzer FC players
FC Rot-Weiß Erfurt players
TSG Neustrelitz players
Malchower SV players
FC 08 Villingen players
Torgelower FC Greif players
Brandenburger SC Süd 05 players
3. Liga players
Regionalliga players
Oberliga (football) players